Fundacion El Hacedor is a non-profit organization founded in August 2007 by the writer José Luis Rodríguez Pittí in order to develop cultural, social and educational projects, using literature, music, art and creativity as a vehicle to achieve personal and community development.

Other projects, Fundacion El Hacedor has collaborated or been responsible for include, cultural recovery projects, to highlight Panamanian identity, education and training programs, programs with risk groups (prisons, schools in red zones), national forums, conferences, recitals, environmental projects, publishing projects (paper-based and electronic), artistic events and concerts.

Some past activities of Fundacion El Hacedor are: Convergence Point (with La Novena), Art from the Earth (with UNEP, United Nations, and Sembrarte), Literatour: Culture in the Provinces (with Panamanian Government), Leer es una Fiesta (with French Embassy in Panamá and the Alliance Francaise), the Congreso Internacional de Literatura Centroamericana (with the Universidad Tecnológica de Panamá and Purdue University), the Forum for Culture and Development (with Enredarte, Fundación Danilo Pérez, the Panamanian Government, and other cultural organizations), and the Festival of Arts and Literature (with more than twenty public and private organizations) in 2010 and 2011, in the city of San Francisco de la Montaña in the Province of Veraguas, Panama, to bring art, music and literature to the country's poorest communities.

External links 
 Official website (in Spanish)
 Panamanian Literature in Buenos Aires (Diario La Prensa, in Spanish)
 Forum for Culture and Development (Diario La Prensa, in Spanish)
 Past activities (In Spanish)

Organizations established in 2007
Panamanian culture
Non-profit organizations based in Panama